Alu (also Romanized as Ālū, Āllū, and Alov) is a village in Sanjabad-e Shomali Rural District, in the Central District of Kowsar County, Ardabil Province, Iran. At the 2006 census, its population was 86, in 17 families.

References

External Links 
Tageo

Towns and villages in Kowsar County